Manfred Zojer (born 1 June 1939) is an Austrian speed skater. He competed in the men's 500 metres event at the 1964 Winter Olympics.

References

1939 births
Living people
Austrian male speed skaters
Olympic speed skaters of Austria
Speed skaters at the 1964 Winter Olympics
Sportspeople from Klagenfurt